A Weird Exits is the seventeenth studio album by American garage rock band Thee Oh Sees, released on August 12, 2016, on Castle Face Records. It is the first studio album to feature drummers Ryan Moutinho and Dan Rincon, who joined the band in 2015 to tour in support of the band's previous album, Mutilator Defeated at Last.

A Weird Exits was the first of two studio albums released by Thee Oh Sees in 2016, with a companion album, entitled An Odd Entrances,  released on November 18, 2016.

Background and recording
During breaks from the band's extensive tour in support of Mutilator Defeated at Last, the band would jam new song ideas at rehearsals, with vocalist and guitarist John Dwyer recording the ideas onto a cassette to listen to and choose his favourite ideas.

The album and its companion, An Odd Entrances, was mostly recorded as a live band with the band's regular engineer and collaborator Chris Woodhouse. Regarding the recording process drummer Ryan Moutinho noted, "We recorded all of that in three days. Actually... I'm going to say four, but I really think it was three. I was really sick. I had a one-hundred-and-twenty degree fever and was vomiting. I recorded the whole record in a hoody, with the hood up. We went in there, did that, and then me, Tim [Hellman] and Dan [Rincon] all went home, and John stayed and finished it."

Release
The album had two special vinyl editions made: the "Murky Web" edition, limited to 1700 copies, and the "Bloodshot Eyeball" edition, limited to 300 copies. A third was released in the UK, simply titled "Green".

Critical reception

A Weird Exits received widespread acclaim from music critics. At Metacritic, which assigns a normalized rating out of 100 to reviews from mainstream critics, the album received an average score of 82 based on 19 reviews, indicating "universal acclaim".

Writing for AllMusic, Tim Sendra praised the album's variety, John Dwyer's guitar playing and the band's consistent output: "With Mutilator, and now this album, the band is firing on all cylinders and then some, making psych-prog-metal-punk jams for the ages."

Accolades

Track listing

Personnel
Thee Oh Sees
John Dwyer – guitar, vocals, Mellotron, synths, moisturizer, flute, percussion
Tim Hellman – bass
Dan Rincon – drums
Ryan Moutinho – drums

Additional personnel
Brigid Dawson – vocals on "The Axis"
Chris Woodhouse – drums, organ, guitar, percussion
Greer McGitrick – cello on "Crawl Out from the Fall Out"

Charts

References

2016 albums
Oh Sees albums
Albums with cover art by Robert Beatty (artist)
Castle Face Records albums